Janowiec  is a village in Puławy County, Lublin Voivodeship, in eastern Poland. It is the seat of the gmina (administrative district) called Gmina Janowiec. The village has a population of 1,000.

It received its town charter in 1537, but lost it in 1870.  The ruins of a large castle are nearby.

References
Notes

External links

Janowiec at Jewish Records Indexing - Poland

Janowiec
1537 establishments in Europe